The C.S.M. Paul B. Huff Medal of Honor Memorial Parkway, more commonly known as Paul B. Huff Parkway or Paul Huff Parkway, is a major east–west thoroughfare which runs through northern Cleveland, Tennessee. While not a numbered highway, it serves as a connector between U.S. Route 11 (US 11) and State Route 60 (SR 60) as well as to Interstate 75 (I-75), is maintained by the Tennessee Department of Transportation (TDOT), and has come to be one of the most heavily traveled and widely used roads in the city, with many corporate and private businesses locating to it. In 2017 the parkway had an annual average daily traffic (AADT) volume of 26,762 vehicles. The road is named in honor of Paul B. Huff, a Cleveland-born recipient of the Medal of Honor for his actions in World War II.

Route description

Paul Huff Parkway begins at an intersection with SR 60 (Georgetown Road) in the northwestern part of the city. It then immediately crosses Candies Creek Ridge as an undivided four-lane road. After crossing the ridge it comes to an intersection with Frontage Road/Adkisson Drive, where a center (turn) lane begins. Adkisson connects to Cleveland State Community College. About  later the road comes to an interchange with I-75. Afterwards the road enters a large corporate and business area coming to an intersection with Peerless Road, and then Mouse Creek Road approximately  later, an alternate route to Charleston. The road then passes by E.L. Ross Elementary School and a shopping center on the opposite side of the road, coming to an intersection with Freedom Parkway approximately  later. The road then passes a fire and ambulance station and crosses South Mouse Creek and the Cleveland/Bradley County Greenway. Ascending to the top of a minor ridge the road comes to an intersection with an untitled connector road to the Bradley Square Mall and Hickory Grove Shopping Center and Walmart on the opposite side of the road. Approximately  later the road comes to an intersection with US 11/SR 2, where it ends and continues east as Stuart Road.

History

The road was first planned as a connector road between the interstate and industrial parks on the northeastern part of the city. A project that preceded the Parkway was the construction of Stuart Road between North Lee Highway and Urbane Road/Old Tasso Road in the mid-1970s, and the extension to Michigan Avenue Road, which was completed on June 27, 1984. Many residents in the area were opposed to the Parkway's construction, as they felt it would bring unwanted commercial development, which it eventually did.

The first section, between Adkisson Drive and US 11, was built between 1986 and 1987. Part of this section replaced a two lane road that ran from the Adkisson Drive/Frontage Road intersection under I-75 to what is now the intersection with Peerless Road. At the same time, the interchange with I-75 was built. The section over Candies Creek Ridge opened on October 8, 1988. This project was very laborious, requiring work crews to blast out and move tons of earth and rock, and stabilize the sides of the ridge between the road. Not initially planned to take place for many more years, this project was made possible by the passage of the Better Roads Program by the Tennessee General Assembly in 1986. The Parkway was dedicated in honor of Sgt. Paul B. Huff on Veterans Day, November 11, 1988. 

Following the opening of the Bradley Square Mall in 1991, the Parkway saw a boom of commercial development from the late 1990s to the mid 2000s. These included several strip malls including the Hickory Grove Shopping Center as well as such stores as Lowe's, The Home Depot, Publix, and several restaurants and hotels.

In 2015, a short extension of the road was constructed west of SR 60. The speed limit was reduced from 50 to 45 miles per hour in early 2016 after a long history of motorists alleging that the 50 mph limit, which was nearly impossible to drive on most of the parkway because of constant stop-and-go traffic, misled many drivers of the conditions of the road and encouraged reckless driving. A short segment of State Route 374 in Clarksville, Tennessee, is also known as the Paul B. Huff Memorial Parkway.

Major intersections

See also

APD-40
U.S. Route 11 Bypass (Cleveland, Tennessee)

References 

Cleveland, Tennessee
Transportation in Bradley County, Tennessee
Roads in Tennessee
U.S. Route 11
Tennessee State Route 60
Parkways in the United States